Chryseobacterium piscicola  is a Gram-negative, rod-shaped and non-motil bacteria from the genus of Chryseobacterium which has been isolated from the salmon Salmo salar from the Los Lagos Region in Chile.

References

Further reading

External links
Type strain of Chryseobacterium piscicola at BacDive -  the Bacterial Diversity Metadatabase

piscicola
Bacteria described in 2009